The Huansu H6 is a MPV produced by Huansu, a brand of the Chonqing Bisu Automotive Corporation, which is closely related to Beiqi-Yinxiang, a joint venture between Beijing Auto (Beiqi) and the Yinxiang Group.

Overview

The Huansu H6 was officially launched during the 2016 Guangzhou Auto Show in China, with prices ranging from 59,800 yuan to 75,300 yuan at launch. The Huansu H6 is a front-mid engine rear wheel drive van with engine options including a 1.5 liter inline-4 petrol engine and a 1.8 liter inline-4 petrol engine, while trim levels include logistics versions in 2-seat and 5-seat configurations, and light passenger versions in 6-seat, 7-seat, and 9-seat configurations.

First versions available to the market was priced between 60,800 yuan and 75,800 yuan and was available from December 2016.

Production ceased in 2018 when the Yinxiang Group was in financial problems and failed to restart production in 2019. The Yinxiang Group finally declared bankruptcy in 2021 with products rebranded under the Ruixiang brand.

Ruixiang Boteng V2
The Ruixiang Boteng V2 is a rebadged Huansu H6 featuring a restyled front end sold under the Ruixiang brand from 2022. The Ruixiang Boteng V2 is powered by a 1.5-litre engine producing a maximum power output of 113hp（83kW）and 150N·m shared with the Ruixiang Boteng V1 mated to a 5-speed manual transmission.

References

External links 

 Official Website

Cars introduced in 2016
Minivans
Rear-wheel-drive vehicles
Mid-engined vehicles
Mid-engined cars
2010s cars
Cars of China